Conidiobolus is a genus of fungi in order Entomophthorales.  Some species were defined in Conidiobolus but then moved into other genera such as Capillidium and Batkoa.

This genus can cause a human infection known as conidiobolomycosis.

Species
There are 54 species of Conidiobolus. 

Conidiobolus adieretus Drechsler, 1953  (= Capillidium adiaeretum (Drechsler) B. Huang & Y. Nie (2020))
Conidiobolus antarcticus S. Tosi, Caretta & Humber, 2004
Conidiobolus apiculatus 
Conidiobolus bangalorensis Sriniv. & Thirum., 1967 
Conidiobolus batkoi 
Conidiobolus brefeldianus Couch, 1939
Conidiobolus caecilius S. Keller, 2007
Conidiobolus carpentieri (Giard) Remaud. & S. Keller, 1980
Conidiobolus cercopidis 
Conidiobolus cercopidis 
Conidiobolus chlamydosporus Drechsler, 1955
Conidiobolus chlapowskii Bałazy, J. Wiśn. & S. Kaczm., 1987
Conidiobolus conglomeratus 
Conidiobolus coronatus (Costantin) A. Batko, 1964
Conidiobolus couchii Sriniv. & Thirum., 1968 
Conidiobolus dabieshanensis Y. Nie & B. Huang, 2017
Conidiobolus denaeosporus Drechsler, 1957
Conidiobolus destruens 
Conidiobolus eurymitus Drechsler, 1965
Conidiobolus eurypus Drechsler, 1957
Conidiobolus firmipilleus Drechsler, 1953
Conidiobolus giganteus 
Conidiobolus globuliferus Drechsler, 1957
Conidiobolus gonimodes Drechsler, 1962
Conidiobolus grylli 
Conidiobolus gustafssonii Bałazy, 1993
Conidiobolus heterosporus Drechsler, 1953  (= Capillidium heterosporum (Drechsler) B. Huang & Y. Nie  (2020) )
Conidiobolus humicola Sriniv. & Thirum., 1962
Conidiobolus incongruus Drechsler, 1960
Conidiobolus inordinatus Drechsler, 1957
Conidiobolus iuxtagenitus S. D. Waters & Callaghan, 1989 
Conidiobolus khandalensis Sriniv. & Thirum., 1963
Conidiobolus lachnodes Drechsler, 1955
Conidiobolus lamprauges Drechsler, 1953
Conidiobolus lichenicola Sriniv. & Thirum., 1968
Conidiobolus lobatus Sriniv. & Thirum., 1968
Conidiobolus macrosporus Sriniv. & Thirum., 1967 
Conidiobolus major 
Conidiobolus margaritatus B. Huang, Humber & K. T. Hodge, 2007
Conidiobolus megalotocus Drechsler, 1957
Conidiobolus minor 
Conidiobolus multivagus Drechsler, 1960 
Conidiobolus mycophagus Sriniv. & Thirum., 1965
Conidiobolus mycophilus Sriniv. & Thirum., 1965
Conidiobolus nanodes  Drechsler, 1955
Conidiobolus nodosus Sriniv. & Thirum., 1967
Conidiobolus obscurus (I. M. Hall & P. H. Dunn) Remaud. & S. Keller, 1980
Conidiobolus papillatus 
Conidiobolus parvus Drechsler, 1962
Conidiobolus paulus Drechsler, 1957 
Conidiobolus polyspermus Drechsler, 1962 
Conidiobolus polytocus Drechsler, 1955
Conidiobolus pseudapiculatus 
Conidiobolus pseudapiculatus 
Conidiobolus pseudococci 
Conidiobolus pseudococcus 
Conidiobolus pumilus Drechsler, 1955
Conidiobolus rhynchosporus  Drechsler, 1954 
Conidiobolus rhysosporus Drechsler, 1954
Conidiobolus rugosus Drechsler, 1955 
Conidiobolus sinensis Y. Nie, X. Y. Liu & B. Huang, 2012 
Conidiobolus stilbeus Y. Nie & B. Huang, 2016
Conidiobolus stromoideus Sriniv. & Thirum., 1963
Conidiobolus tenthredinis 
Conidiobolus terrestris Sriniv. & Thirum., 1968
Conidiobolus thermophilus Waing., S. K. Singh & M. C. Sriniv., 2008
Conidiobolus thromboides Drechsler, 1953
Conidiobolus tipulae 
Conidiobolus undulatus Drechsler, 1957
Conidiobolus utriculosus Bref., 1884 
Conidiobolus villosus

References

Entomophthorales
Fungus genera
Taxa named by Julius Oscar Brefeld